James Edward Pleass (21 May 1923 – 16 February 2016) was a Welsh cricketer. Pleass was a right-handed batsman.

Life and career
Born in Cardiff, Pleass made his first-class debut for Glamorgan in the 1947 County Championship against Derbyshire.  He played first-class cricket for Glamorgan for nearly a decade, making 171 first-class appearances, with his final appearance coming against Warwickshire in the 1956 County Championship.  An aggressive middle-order batsman, Pleass scored a total of 4,293 runs at an average of 19.33.  He made eleven half centuries, while his sole century, a score of 102 not out, came against Yorkshire in 1955, securing Glamorgan their first victory against Yorkshire in Yorkshire.  His most successful season came in 1950, when he made 28 first-class appearances, scoring in the process 740 runs at an average of 24.66.  A good cover fielder, Pleass took 77 catches in the field.

Following his retirement from first-class cricket in 1956, Pleass went into business in Cardiff.  He also served on the Glamorgan committee, as well as having served as the secretary of the Glamorgan Former Players Association. Pleass died in Cardiff in February 2016, aged 92. He was the last surviving member of the Glamorgan side that won the 1948 County Championship.

References

External links
Jim Pleass at ESPNcricinfo
Jim Pleass at CricketArchive

1923 births
2016 deaths
Cricketers from Cardiff
Welsh cricketers
Glamorgan cricketers
Welsh cricket administrators